Positive is a studio album by the Jamaican reggae group Black Uhuru, released in 1987. A dub album, Positive Dub, was released the same year. Positive was the final album with vocalist Delroy "Junior" Reid.

Production
The album was produced by Steven Stanley. Sly and Robbie, who had produced Black Uhuru on earlier albums, appear as backing musicians. Puma Jones left the band before production began, and was replaced by Olafunke; Jones is still credited on the album.

Critical reception

Robert Christgau wrote that "Sly and Robbie won't knock you out, but on Uhuru's best records they never do—given the right songs and performances, all they have to do is make them righter." Trouser Press thought that the album "finds [Delroy] Reid coming into his own as a vocalist, and features a few songs that are strikingly original." The Ottawa Citizen called the album "uplifting, yet realistic," writing that it "paints real, and often graphic, pictures of conflict in the Third World." The St. Petersburg Times wrote that "at its best, Black Uhuru combines the persistent dance-inciting rhythms of pure reggae with substantial pop melodies and soulful vocals." The Washington Post opined that "occasionally missing ... is the sheer tunefulness the band has displayed in the past."

Track listing

Personnel
Derrick "Duckie" Simpson - vocals
Delroy "Junior" Reid - vocals
Olafunke - vocals
Sly Dunbar - drums
Robbie Shakespeare - bass
Asher - keyboards
Chinna Smith - guitar
Rass Brass - horns

References

1987 albums
Black Uhuru albums